Sean McDermott (born 30 May 1993) is a professisonal footballer playing as a goalkeeper, for Kristiansund. Born in Norway, he has represented the Republic of Ireland at youth level. He has previously played for Start and Dinamo București, among others.

Personal life 
McDermott was born to a Norwegian mother and a Donegal-born father in Kristiansand where he also grew up. He lived in Donegal for six months when he was 9 and played in goal for his local Gaelic football club.

Career

Arsenal
McDermott joined Arsenal's youth team in July 2009 after a successful ten-day trial with the club as a 15-year-old in May 2008. McDermott signed for Arsenal from Kristiansand minnows IK Våg in November 2008, but didn't officially complete his move to the club until after he turned 16 at the end of May 2009.

McDermott has declared his international allegiance to the Republic of Ireland. He signed his first professional contract with the club in June 2010.

McDermott joined Leeds United on a one-month loan.

McDermott was released by Arsenal in the summer of 2012, before he signed with Norwegian club Sandnes Ulf on 15 August 2012. He made his debut in Tippeligaen in the match against Rosenborg on 19 October 2012, instead of the first-choice goalkeeper Aslak Falch. When Sandnes Ulf faced Rosenborg again, in the following season, McDermott was accused of fouling the Rosenborg-player Nicki Bille Nielsen in the penalty box, but the referee awarded a free-kick to McDermott. Bille Nielsen's taking off his shirt in frustration earned him a second yellow card in the game. The match ended with a 1–0 victory for Sandnes Ulf. Sandnes Ulf were relegated in 2014, but in the summer transfer window of 2015, McDermott returned to the first tier as he joined IK Start.

Kristiansund
Prior to the 2017-season he joined newly promoted Kristiansund.

Career statistics

Club

References

External links

1993 births
Living people
Association footballers from County Donegal
Association football goalkeepers
Expatriate footballers in Romania
Gaelic footballers who switched code
Gaelic football goalkeepers
Irish expatriate sportspeople in Romania
Irish people of Norwegian descent
Republic of Ireland association footballers
Republic of Ireland expatriate association footballers
Republic of Ireland youth international footballers
Republic of Ireland under-21 international footballers
Sportspeople from Kristiansand
Arsenal F.C. players
Leeds United F.C. players
Sandnes Ulf players
Eliteserien players
Norwegian First Division players
IK Start players
Ullensaker/Kisa IL players
Kristiansund BK players
Liga I players
FC Dinamo București players